Events in the year 1852 in Argentina.

Incumbents
 Governor of Buenos Aires Province: Juan Manuel de Rosas (de facto Head of State of Argentina
 Governor of Cordoba: Manuel López then Alejo Carmen Guzmán
 Governor of Santa Fe Province: Domingo Crespo
 Provisional Director of the Argentine Confederation: Justo José de Urquiza

Events
 January 29 – Platine War: Battle of Alvarez Field. 4,000 Rosas loyalist Argentine troops led two of General Ángel Pacheco's colonel defeated by anti-Rosas forces.
 January 31 – Two anti-Rosas divisions defeat Pacheco's forces at the Battle of Marques Bridge
 February 1 – anti-Rosas coalition camps 9 km (5.6 mi) from Buenos Aires
 February 2 – brief skirmish between anti-Rosas coalition and Rosas loyalists end with loyalists retreat
 February 3 – Platine War: Battle of Caseros. Rosas overthrown and exiled from Argentina
 February 4 – surviving soldiers of Regimento Aquino, composed of Rosas loyalists who had defected from anti-Rosas coalition, summarily executed by firing squad
 February 20 – Brazilian forces, part of victorious anti-Rosas coalition, parade through Buenos Aires to mark 25th anniversary of Battle of Ituzaingó in Cisplatine War
 May 31 – San Nicolás Agreement
 September 11 – coup d'etat in Argentina; Buenos Aires Province declares independence.
 Yellow fever in Buenos Aires epidemic

Births

Deaths
 February 4 – Martiniano Chilavert, former Unitarian turned Rosas loyalist, executed by firing squad

 
1850s in Argentina
Years of the 19th century in Argentina